Custume Barracks is a military installation at Athlone in Ireland.

History

Barracks
The barracks were built originally as temporary accommodation for cavalry and infantry units in 1691. The barracks are named after a Sergeant Custume, who defended the bridge from the forces of King William III during the 1690 Siege of Athlone. The barracks were taken over by forces of the Irish Free State in 1922 and served as the headquarters of 4th Western Brigade until the brigade was disbanded and is now part of 2 Brigade which is headquartered from Cathal Brugha Barracks in Dublin. The barracks remains the home of 6th Infantry Battalion as the lead unit, and 2nd Brigade Artillery Regiment and detachments of 2 Engineer Company and the Medical Corps.

Nuclear bunker
During the Cold War, there were contingency plans in place that, in the event of a nuclear exchange, cabinet ministers, senior civil servants and military advisers would use an underground nuclear bunker at Custume Barracks. The bunker was equipped with a command and control centre with communications equipment – which had a hotline to the British government in Whitehall – a map room pointing out important areas for protection, kitchen, bedroom and bathroom facilities to accommodate up to 100 persons.

In 1968 a larger nuclear bunker, housing the Integrated National Control Centre (INCC), was planned for Athlone. This was planned to have capacity to accommodate and feed up to 300 people for a month, and allow the Government to continue in the event of a nuclear emergency. The plans for this new bunker never went ahead.

See also
 List of Irish military installations

References

 

Barracks in the Republic of Ireland
Buildings and structures in Athlone